Igor Igorevich Portnyagin (born 7 January 1989) is a Russian former professional footballer who played as a forward.

Club career
He made his debut for the senior squad of FC Rubin Kazan on 5 August 2008 in a Russian Cup game against FC Smena Komsomolsk-na-Amure. He made his Russian Premier League debut for Rubin on 4 April 2009 in a game against FC Moscow.

On 27 June 2017, he joined FC Ural Yekaterinburg on loan for the 2017–18 season.

On 17 January 2019, he joined FC Baltika Kaliningrad on loan until the end of the 2018–19 season.

He left Lokomotiv upon the expiration of his contract on 30 June 2019.

On 4 July 2019, he signed with FC Nizhny Novgorod.

International
On 31 March 2015, Portnyagin made his debut for the Russia national football team in a friendly game against Kazakhstan.

Honours

Club
Rubin Kazan
Russian Football Premier League: 2009
Russian Super Cup: 2010

Lokomotiv Moscow
 Russian Cup: 2016-17

Career statistics

Club

Notes

References

External links
 
 

1989 births
Sportspeople from Vladivostok
Living people
Russian footballers
Russia under-21 international footballers
Russia international footballers
FC Rubin Kazan players
Russian Premier League players
PFC Spartak Nalchik players
FC Tom Tomsk players
PFC Krylia Sovetov Samara players
FC Lokomotiv Moscow players
FC Ural Yekaterinburg players
FC Khimki players
FC Baltika Kaliningrad players
Association football forwards
FC Neftekhimik Nizhnekamsk players
FC Nizhny Novgorod (2015) players